Muhammad Fajar Fathur Rahman (born 29 May 2002) is an Indonesian professional footballer who plays as a winger or right-back for Liga 1 club Borneo Samarinda.

Club career

Borneo
He was signed for Borneo to play in Liga 1 in the 2021 season. Fajar made his professional debut on 4 September 2021 in a match against Persebaya Surabaya at the Wibawa Mukti Stadium, Cikarang.

Career statistics

Club

Notes

Honours

International
Indonesia U-16
 AFF U-16 Youth Championship: 2018
Indonesia U-19
 AFF U-19 Youth Championship third place: 2019
Individual
 Indonesia President's Cup Best Young Player: 2022

References

External links
 Fajar Fathur Rahman at Soccerway
 Fajar Fathur Rahman at Liga Indonesia

2002 births
Living people
People from Manokwari
Indonesia youth international footballers
Indonesian footballers
Liga 1 (Indonesia) players
Borneo F.C. players
Association football midfielders